Mohinder Pal Singh (born 16 October 1962) is an Indian field hockey player. He competed in the men's tournament at the 1988 Summer Olympics.

References

External links
 

1962 births
Living people
Field hockey players from Uttar Pradesh
Indian male field hockey players
Olympic field hockey players of India
Field hockey players at the 1988 Summer Olympics
Sportspeople from Meerut
Asian Games medalists in field hockey
Asian Games bronze medalists for India
Medalists at the 1986 Asian Games
Field hockey players at the 1986 Asian Games